Major-General Robert Harley Wordsworth CB, CBE (21 July 1894 – 22 November 1984) was a British Indian Army officer and an Australian politician.

Military career
Born in Collarenebri, New South Wales, Wordsworth was educated at North Sydney Grammar School. He was commissioned into the Australian Imperial Force on 27 August 1914 as an officer of 1st Light Horse Regiment.

During World War I Wordsworth served at Gallipoli, Egypt and Palestine between May 1915 and November 1917 and was mentioned in dispatches. After transferring to the Indian Army on 3 November 1917, he was appointed to the 16th Cavalry on 7 November 1917. He went on to serve in Waziristan between 1919 and 1921 with his regiment which was amalgamated with the 13th Duke of Connaught's Lancers in June 1921 to form the 13/16th Cavalry which itself was renamed the 6th Duke of Connaught's Own Lancers in July 1922.

Wordsworth was Adjutant and then a Squadron Commander with the regiment during the North West Frontier operations between 1930 and 1931. He was appointed commanding officer of the 6th Duke of Connaught's Own Lancers on 11 June 1939.

Wordsworth also served in World War II. In July 1940 he was appointed commander of the 1st Indian Armoured Brigade, which was renamed 251st Indian Armoured Brigade in October 1941, as part of 1st Indian Armoured Division, later renamed 31st Indian Armoured Division. Promoted Acting Major-General on 28 March 1942, he was appointed commander of the 31st Indian Armoured Division in May 1942. As part of the British 10th Army, his division was stationed in Persia in 1942. At that time, the British 10th Army was part Paiforce (formerly Iraqforce) under the Persia and Iraq Command. In December 1944 he was appointed Director of Armoured Fighting Vehicles, India. He was made a Commander of the Order of the British Empire in 1943, promoted to major-general on 6 June 1944 and appointed a Companion of the Order of the Bath in 1945.

Retirement
He retired to Australia in 1947 and became a farmer at Westbury in Tasmania. In 1949, he was elected to the Australian Senate as a Liberal Senator for Tasmania. He was re-elected in 1951, and 1953 defeated in 1958 with his term finishing on 30 June 1959. In 1962, he was appointed Administrator of Norfolk Island, serving until 1964. Wordsworth died in 1984, aged 90. His son, David Wordsworth, was a member of the Western Australian Legislative Council.

References

Bibliography

External links
Generals of World War II

Administrators of Norfolk Island
Liberal Party of Australia members of the Parliament of Australia
Members of the Australian Senate for Tasmania
Members of the Australian Senate
1894 births
1984 deaths
Military personnel from New South Wales
Indian Army generals of World War II
Indian Army personnel of World War I
British Indian Army generals
Companions of the Order of the Bath
Commanders of the Order of the British Empire
20th-century Australian politicians
Australian military personnel of World War I
People from New South Wales